Neopanax is a genus of flowering plants in the family Araliaceae, native to New Zealand, including the Kermadec Islands. It may be a synonym of Pseudopanax.

Species
Currently accepted species include:

Neopanax arboreus (L.f.) Allan
Neopanax colensoi (Hook.f.) Allan
Neopanax kermadecensis (W.R.B.Oliv.) Allan
Neopanax laetus (Kirk) Allan
Neopanax macintyrei (Cheeseman) Frodin

References

Araliaceae
Apiales genera
Endemic flora of New Zealand
Flora of the Kermadec Islands
Flora of the North Island
Flora of the South Island